Hendrik "Henk" Schenk (born 29 April 1945 in Wieringerwaard) is an American former wrestler who competed in the 1968 Summer Olympics and in the 1972 Summer Olympics.

Schenk is a cousin of the speed skater Ard Schenk, who won one silver and three gold medals at the 1968 and 1972 Winter Olympics.

References

External links
 

1945 births
Living people
Olympic wrestlers of the United States
Wrestlers at the 1968 Summer Olympics
Wrestlers at the 1972 Summer Olympics
American male sport wrestlers
Dutch emigrants to the United States
People from Anna Paulowna
Sportspeople from North Holland